Vanessa Jane Feltz is an English television personality, broadcaster, and journalist. She has appeared on various television shows, including Vanessa (1994–1998), The Big Breakfast (1996–1998), The Vanessa Show (1999), Celebrity Big Brother (2001), The Wright Stuff (2003–2005), This Morning (2006–present), and Strictly Come Dancing (2013).

Feltz presented an early morning radio show on BBC Radio 2 from 2011 to 2022 and also hosted the Breakfast Show on BBC Radio London. Since September 2022, she has presented the weekday drivetime show on Talkradio and TalkTV.

Early life
Vanessa Feltz was born in Islington, London, and grew up in Pine Grove, Totteridge. She has a sister, Julia, who is 3 years her junior. On her radio show she frequently refers to Totteridge as "the Beverly Hills of North London" and her middle class Jewish background as like "growing up in Fiddler on the Roof". Her father, Norman, was in the lingerie business.

Feltz was educated at Haberdashers' Aske's School for Girls, an independent school in Elstree, Hertfordshire. She then read English at Trinity College, Cambridge, graduating with a first class honours degree.

Career

1980s and 1990s: Early career 
Feltz was the first female columnist for The Jewish Chronicle and later joined the Daily Mirror. She wrote her first book at this time entitled What Are These Strawberries Doing on My Nipples? I Need Them for the Fruit Salad.

Feltz replaced Paula Yates on Channel 4's morning TV show The Big Breakfast, presenting a regular item where she interviewed celebrities whilst lying on a bed. She has alleged that she was sexually assaulted by Rolf Harris while interviewing him on the programme. In 1997, Feltz was tricked by the spoof TV show Brass Eye. She also served as a magistrate from the age of 28, but was asked to stand down when she became recognisable by the defendants from her TV appearances.

She presented the ITV daytime television chat show, Vanessa, made by Anglia Television. She moved to the BBC to host a similar show, The Vanessa Show, in 1998 in a reported £2.7 million deal. ITV replaced her show with Trisha.

In 1999, The Vanessa Show suffered from bad publicity as some guests were alleged to have been actors. Despite her having had no involvement in the booking of guests, Feltz was seen to be at fault, and the show was cancelled soon after.

2000s: BBC London 94.9, Celebrity Big Brother and more reality television
In 2001, Feltz joined the local radio station BBC London 94.9 to present a mid-afternoon phone-in show and it continued to run since then at various times, from 2005 to 2015 at 09.00 to noon. From 2016 it was broadcast from 07.00 to 10.00 Monday to Friday. She hosted her last show for the station on 26 August 2022.

Also in 2001, Feltz was a contestant on the first series of Celebrity Big Brother. She has appeared on its spin-off shows Big Brother's Big Mouth, Big Brother's Little Brother and Big Brother's Bit on the Side on numerous occasions.

In 2002, she made a cameo appearance in the comedy film Once Upon a Time in the Midlands. In May 2003, she was voted 93rd on the list of worst Britons in Channel 4's poll of the 100 Worst Britons.

Between 2003 and 2005, Feltz made regular appearances on five's The Wright Stuff, but then had to depart the show because the timing clashed with her new radio show.

In 2004, she made an appearance in a sketch in the first episode of the second series of BBC comedy sketch show Little Britain, playing a spokeswoman for fictional slimming club Fat Fighters. Also in that year she appeared in the second series of reality TV show Celebrity Fit Club in a bid to lose weight.

Feltz has also appeared on three different episodes of The Weakest Link. In two episodes she made it to the final round but lost to Sue Perkins on one occasion and to Tony Slattery on the other. The third episode she appeared on was the Special 1,000 Celebratory episode to celebrate 1,000 episodes of The Weakest Link being made. She was the 6th one voted off.

Feltz's other game show appearances include an episode of Russian Roulette, hosted by Rhona Cameron.

2010s: Radio 2, Channel 5 and Strictly Come Dancing

In 2010, Feltz and Ofoedu won their episode of the Virgin 1 show A Restaurant in our Living Room, preparing a dinner at their home for 25 people.

Feltz returned to the Big Brother house on 3 September 2010 during Ultimate Big Brother, the last series to be broadcast on Channel 4. She was evicted from the house on 8 September, two days before the final.

Feltz took on a greater workload of radio and TV presenting in 2011. She took over the BBC Radio 2 Early Breakfast Show on 17 January 2011 broadcasting from 05:00 until 06:30 each weekday in the slot formerly occupied by Sarah Kennedy. Writing of her Radio 2 debut, The Daily Telegraph radio critic, Gillian Reynolds described Feltz's voice as "like lemon tea with honey". From January 2021, her show was extended by an hour and began at the earlier time of 04:00. She often covered Jeremy Vine's news and current affairs show on Radio 2 when Vine was away. During this time her early breakfast show was covered by another presenter, usually Nicki Chapman. Feltz announced on 28 July 2022 that she would leave the show the following day, and Radio 2 after 2 weeks of covering for Jeremy Vine on 26 August.

On 7 March 2011, Channel 5 moved The Vanessa Show to an afternoon slot at 14:15 following disappointing ratings for the morning slot. The move allowed Feltz to appear in live editions of her TV show after her morning radio commitments. Ratings eventually improved and a second series of the show was planned to commence in September 2011 but it never went ahead. The Guardians "Media Monkey" blog dubbed Feltz "officially the hardest working woman in broadcasting" due to her weekday broadcasting commitments.

On 7 September 2013, she re-entered the Celebrity Big Brother house to take part in a task. She left the house the same day.

In July 2019, the BBC Annual Report recorded that Feltz was one of three women, along with Claudia Winkleman and Zoe Ball, amongst the ten highest paid BBC presenters, with a salary of £355,000.

Personal life
Feltz married surgeon Michael Kurer in 1983; they divorced in 2000. 

In December 2006, Feltz became engaged to singer Ben Ofoedu. They originally planned to marry the following year but they remained engaged for many years without marrying. Feltz announced in February 2023 that she and Ofoedu had recently separated.

She has two daughters and four grandchildren. Her elder daughter is Allegra Benitah, a former tax lawyer who is now a television baker and chef.

She lives in St John's Wood, London, in a house which was previously owned by Charles Saatchi, and which was featured in Sir John Betjeman's documentary MetroLand (1973).

References

External links

 Vanessa at the British Film Institute's Screenonline

Living people
Alumni of Trinity College, Cambridge
English columnists
English Jews
English radio personalities
BBC Radio 2 presenters
English television presenters
GMTV presenters and reporters
People educated at Haberdashers' Girls' School
People from Islington (district)
People from St John's Wood
People from Totteridge
British women radio presenters
1962 births
Jewish women